Gneysovaya Peak is a peak,  high, on the ridge connecting Krakken Mountain and Sandseten Mountain in the Westliche Petermann Range, Wohlthat Mountains, Antarctica. It was discovered and plotted from air photos by the Third German Antarctic Expedition, 1938–39. It was mapped from air photos and surveys by the Sixth Norwegian Antarctic Expedition, 1956–60, remapped by the Soviet Antarctic Expedition, 1960–61, and named "Gora Gneysovaya" (gneiss mountain).

References

Mountains of Queen Maud Land
Princess Astrid Coast